Klaipėda city passenger transport is a Public Enterprise and public transport service organizing, supervising and coordinating body in Klaipėda city, Lithuania.

History
Public Enterprise Klaipėda city passenger transport - was founded on  March 27, 2003, by Klaipeda City Municipality Council Decision number 1-81. Klaipėda city passenger transport administration was granted an office located at Kalnupės g. 1, Klaipėda  Klaipeda was the first among the major Lithuanian cities, which declined to obsolete outdated Hungarian Ikarus passenger busses. Klaipeda was a first city in Lithuania, which introduced electronic ticketing system in Lithianian public transport. In December 2009 Klaipėda city passenger transport headquarters moved from the old office at Kalnupės street 1 to the office at S. Daukanto street 15. Since 2010 On January 1, Klaipėda residents start providing monthly parking passes.

International projects
Klaipėda city passenger transport is involved in the following international projects:
 MoCuBa,
 PROCEED,
 PIMMS Transfer.,
 BAY in TRAP.

References

Transport companies of Lithuania
Transport in Klaipėda
Transport companies established in 2003
2003 establishments in Lithuania
Companies based in Klaipėda